Sônia Maria Roque da Costa, commonly known as Sônia (born 4 August 1968), is a Brazilian former football defender who played for the Brazil women's national football team. 

She competed at the 1996 Summer Olympics, playing four matches. At the club level, she played for Ítalo Serrano.

See also
 Brazil at the 1996 Summer Olympics

References

External links
 Profile at sports-reference.com

1968 births
Living people
Brazilian women's footballers
Place of birth missing (living people)
Footballers at the 1996 Summer Olympics
Olympic footballers of Brazil
Women's association football defenders
Brazil women's international footballers
People from Rio Branco, Acre
Sportspeople from Acre (state)